This is a list of mayors of Houston, British Columbia. The municipality is part of the Regional District of Bulkley-Nechako.

Chairmen 
Lee M. Newgard 1957-1964
Elmer A. Everson 1964-1968
Lee Bremner 1968-1969

Mayors 
Claude L. Parish 1969-1971

Lee Bremner August 1971-December 1971
Charles T. Sullivan 1972-1974
Jack Kempf 1974-1977
Bas E. Studer 1977-1979
Adrian Meeuwissen 1979-1983
Bill Mikaelsson 1983-1985
Adrian Meeuwissen 1985-1986
Tom Euverman 1986-2002
Sharon Smith 2002-2008
Bill Holmberg 2008-2014
Shane Brienen 2014-present

Houston